The Export and Import Permits Act (EIPA) is an Act passed by the Parliament of Canada originally in 1947 though it has had many amendments over the years. It was assented originally by King George VI through his agent the Governor-General of Canada. At present, contraventions are punishable by a prison term not exceeding ten years.
 The EIPA falls under the control of the Minister of Foreign Affairs (Canada).

References

Canadian federal legislation
1947 in Canadian law